Birgitta Bengtsson (born 16 May 1965) is a Swedish sailor. She won a silver medal in the 470 class at the 1988 Summer Olympics with Marit Söderström.

References

External links
 
 
 
 

1965 births
Living people
Swedish female sailors (sport)
Olympic sailors of Sweden
Sailors at the 1988 Summer Olympics – 470
Olympic silver medalists for Sweden
Olympic medalists in sailing
Royal Gothenburg Yacht Club sailors
World champions in sailing for Sweden
470 class world champions
Medalists at the 1988 Summer Olympics
20th-century Swedish women